This is a list of parliaments of Iceland.

Historical overview
Commonwealth of Iceland (930–1262)
The parliament was founded at Þingvellir in 930. It held both legislative and judicial power but no executive power was present in the country.
Union with Norway (1262–1814)
When Iceland became a dependency of Norway, the legislative power of the parliament was shared with the king of Norway who ruled through his officials. Laws adopted by the parliament were subject to royal assent and, conversely, if the king initiated legislation,  the parliament had to give its consent.
Danish monarchy (1380–1944)
Norway falls under the control the Danish monarchy and Iceland along with it. The parliament served almost exclusively as a court of law until the year 1800 when it was disbanded by royal decree.
A royal decree providing for the reestablishment of the parliament was issued on 8 March 1843. Elections were held the following year and the assembly finally met on 1 July 1845. The parliament functioned however only as a consultative assembly.
Constitution of Iceland (1874)
The constitution of 1874 granted to the parliament joint legislative power with the crown in matters of exclusive Icelandic concern. The king retained the right to veto legislation and often, on the advice of his ministers, refused to consent to legislation adopted by the parliament.
The parliament began meeting in the newly built Parliament House in 1881 and has done so ever since.
A constitutional amendment, confirmed on 3 October 1903, granted Icelanders home rule and parliamentary government.
After 1915 standing committees began operating in the parliament for the first time. The parliament was bicameral and each chamber had the same seven standing committees.
Kingdom of Iceland (1918–1944)
The parliament was granted unrestricted legislative power.
Republic of Iceland (1944–present)
In May 1991 the parliament became unicameral, operating in a unified chamber.
Iceland joins the European Economic Area in 1994, thus transferring significant legislative power to the European Union.

Parliament as a legislature (1875–present)

Althing
Legislatures by legislative term of office
Parliaments